Edward Larrabee Barnes (April 22, 1915 – September 22, 2004) was an American architect. His work was characterized by the "fusing [of] Modernism with vernacular architecture and understated design." Barnes was best known for his adherence to strict geometry, simple monolithic shapes and attention to material detail. Among his best-known projects are the Haystack School, Christian Theological Seminary, Dallas Museum of Art, the Walker Art Center, 599 Lexington Avenue, the Thurgood Marshall Federal Judiciary Building, and the IBM Building at 590 Madison Avenue.

Early life and education 
Barnes was born in Chicago, Illinois, into a family he described as "incense-swinging High Episcopalians", consisting of Cecil Barnes, a lawyer, and Margaret Helen Ayer, recipient of a Pulitzer Prize for the novel Year of Grace. Barnes graduated from Harvard in 1938 after studying English and Art History before switching to architecture, then taught at his alma mater Milton Academy, before returning to Harvard for further studies under Walter Gropius and Marcel Breuer. He graduated from the Harvard Graduate School of Design in 1942 and served in the Navy during World War II. After the war he worked for Henry Dreyfuss in Los Angeles designing prototypes for mass-produced homes.

Career 
In 1949 Barnes founded Edward Larrabee Barnes Associates in Manhattan. During his long career, Barnes, with his wife Mary Barnes as interior designer, designed office buildings, museums, botanical gardens, private houses, churches, schools, camps, colleges, campus master plans, and housing. Although best known for the Haystack Mountain College of Arts and other smaller residential homes, the firm also completed a number of master planning urban development projects.

The firm's planning projects include:

 Crown Center
 State University of NY at Purchase (SUNY)
 Florida Atlantic University School of Arts and Letters
 National University of Singapore Housing
 Southwestern Medical Center, Texas
 Stonecrest, San Diego
 SUNY Potsdam
 Indiana University/Purdue
Over the years, he also taught at Harvard University, the Pratt Institute, and the University of Virginia, and served as a member of the Urban Design Council of New York and as vice-president of the American Academy in Rome. In 1969, Barnes was elected into the National Academy of Design as an Associate member and became a full member in 1974. He was elected a Fellow of the American Academy of Arts and Sciences in 1978. In 2007 he was posthumously honored with the American Institute of Architects' highest award, the AIA Gold Medal. He also received the Thomas Jefferson Medal in Architecture, the Harvard University 350th Anniversary Medal, and some forty other awards. His Haystack Mountain School of Crafts won the AIA Twenty-five Year Award.

In 1993 Barnes announced his retirement but he continued to work as a consultant for Lee / Timchula Architects, founded by Barnes' lead partner, John M.Y. Lee, and associate, Michael Timchula. Lee / Timchula inherited various projects that the Barnes' office was awarded.

The AIA Board of Directors posthumously awarded the 2007 AIA Gold Medal to Edward Larrabee Barnes, FAIA.

Barnes died in 2004 in Cupertino, California. His archives are located at the Frances Loeb Library at Harvard University. He is laid to rest on Mt. Desert Island, Maine.

Partners, associates, notable collaborators and architects mentored by Barnes 

 Alistair Bevington (Partner)
 Joseph Capecci
Dan Casey (Partner)
Mark Cavagnero
Alexander Cooper
Steven Fisher (Associate)
Charles Gwathmey
Percy Keck
John M.Y. Lee (Lead Partner) F.A.I.A
Toshiko Mori
Laurie Olin
Robert Siegel
 Gajinder Singh (Associate)
Mary L. Merz and Joseph G. Merz (Merz Architects)
James V. Righter (Albert, Righter & Tittmann Architects)

Selected projects list

Haystack Mountain School of Arts and Crafts Master Plan, Deer Isle, ME, 1962
Christian Theological Seminary, Indianapolis, IN, 1966
Bennington College student housing, Bennington, VT 1966
Crown Center Master Plan, Kansas City, MO 1970s
28 State Street, Boston, MA, 1969
Walker Art Center, Minneapolis, MN, 1971
Minneapolis Sculpture Garden, Minneapolis MN, 1971
Smart Museum, Chicago, IL, 1974
Carnegie Museum of Art, Pittsburgh, PA, 1974
Cochrane-Woods Art Center, Chicago, IL, 1974
Visual Arts Center at Bowdoin College, Brunswick, ME, 1975
 Cross Campus Library, Yale University, 1976 (Remodeled in 2007)
Citigroup Center, New York City (collaboration), 1977
Cathedral of the Immaculate Conception, Burlington, VT, 1977
Asia Society building, New York City, 1980
Hyatt Regency Kansas City, 1981 (lobby redesign)
Nora Eccles Harrison Museum of Art, Utah State University, Logan, UT, 1982
590 Madison Avenue, New York City, 1983
Dallas Museum of Art, Dallas, TX, 1984
121 South Main Street, Providence, Rhode Island, 1984
 Gooch Dillard, University of Virginia, Charlottesville, VA, 1984
Museum of Art Fort Lauderdale, Fort Lauderdale, FL 1986
599 Lexington Avenue, New York City, 1986
AXA Center, New York City, 1986 (Equitable Building)
125 West 55th Street, New York City, 1988
Hyde Collection, Glens Falls, NY, 1989 (expansion)
Hammer Museum, Los Angeles, CA, 1990
Knoxville Museum of Art, Knoxville, TN, 1990
Thurgood Marshall Federal Judiciary Building, Washington, DC, 1992
Birmingham Museum of Art, Birmingham, AL, 1993 (expansion)
IUPUI Campus Master Plan, Indianapolis, IN, 1994
National University of Singapore, Master Plan 2 1990's

Gallery

References

Further reading 

Edward Larrabee Barnes: Architect, Rizzoli International Publications, 1995. .
 "Snatched from Oblivion," Jeffrey Head, Metropolis magazine, October 2006, p. 56

External links

 
 Edward Larrabee Barnes at Greatbuildings.com 
Emporis.com biography of Barnes
Edward Larrabee Barn

Modernist architects from the United States
 01
1915 births
2004 deaths
Fellows of the American Academy of Arts and Sciences
Architects from Illinois
Artists from Chicago
Architects from New York City
Harvard Graduate School of Design faculty
Pratt Institute faculty
University of Virginia faculty
Harvard Graduate School of Design alumni
United States Navy personnel of World War II
20th-century American architects
Milton Academy alumni
Recipients of the AIA Gold Medal
Members of the American Academy of Arts and Letters